The Loud House Movie is a 2021 American animated musical comedy film based on and featuring characters from the Nickelodeon series The Loud House. Produced by Nickelodeon Movies, it was directed by Dave Needham in his directorial debut, from a screenplay by Kevin Sullivan and Chris Viscardi, and starring the voices of David Tennant, Michelle Gomez, Katy Townsend, and the regular voice cast of the series; consisting of Asher Bishop, Jill Talley, Brian Stepanek, Catherine Taber, Liliana Mumy, Nika Futterman, Cristina Pucelli, Jessica DiCicco, Grey Griffin, Lara Jill Miller, and Andre Robinson, who reprise their respective roles. The first film in the franchise, set between the fourth and fifth seasons of The Loud House, it tells the story of the Louds going to Scotland, where they learn that they are descended from royalty and own a castle, while contending with an evil plot.

The film was originally going to be theatrically released in 2020 by Paramount Pictures. Instead, the film had a digital release on Netflix on August 20, 2021. It was met with mixed to positive reviews from critics, praising the songs, heartwarming messages, and loyalty to the series, but criticizing the animation, plot, and screenplay. 

A live-action Christmas television film, A Loud House Christmas, was released to Nickelodeon and Paramount+ on November 26, 2021.

Plot
Lincoln Loud, the middle child and only son of Lynn Loud Sr. and Rita Loud, spends his time assisting his sisters - Lori, Leni, Luna, Luan, Lynn, Lucy, Lana, Lola and Lisa - as they go about their day-to-day duties, whilst also teaching his youngest sister Lily how to cope with living in a large family. After a particularly successful day where the sisters all win awards, they celebrate at Lynn Sr.'s restaurant. Whilst there, the Loud sisters are praised by fans whilst Lincoln is pushed to the side and ignored. Feeling that he is living in their shadow, he consults his friend Clyde McBride, who tells him about the time he learnt his grandmother's side of the family was from Paris.

Inspired, Lincoln asks his parents the same question and Lisa manages to trace Lynn Sr.'s heritage to Scotland. The Loud family then heads to Scotland for a week long vacation on a hectic trip involving parachuting from a cargo hold, flying in a hot air balloon, and traveling in a submarine. Upon arriving in the Scottish town of Loch Loud, a town filled with many oddities, the Loud family learns from a boy named Scott who Leni falls in love with and Loud Loch's citizens that they are descendants of Scottish royalty. They are led to a castle ran by groundskeeper Angus and the disgruntled property caretaker Morag.

Angus then shows the family a painting of their ancestors that bears a striking resemblance to themselves and reveals they ruled the town for many years before sailing away forever. Lincoln eventually learns from Angus that his own ancestral counterpart, the Duke of the family, was the most special member of the family, much to his delight. Wanting to become the new Duke of Loch Loud, he partakes in many community service events to help restore the village to its former glory and eventually guilt trips the rest of the family into moving to Scotland forever since the family no longer has to share one bathroom. A bad service call from Lori causes Bobby to think they are breaking up.

As the Louds adjust to their discovery while experiencing the ghost of their descendant Lucille Loud, a baby dragon who grows very fast whenever she eats that they name Lela, and enjoying their time in the castle, Morag becomes frustrated with the family after living in the castle peacefully and quietly for many years. She then devises a plan like her ancestor Aggie to get the family to leave Loch Loud forever by hypnotizing Lela with a magic gemstone known as the Dragon Stone and the royal scepter.

After the sisters begin to get attention in the village, Morag tricks Lincoln into riding Lela to try to get back his attention. While he rides the dragon, she uses the gemstone and scepter to hypnotize it into destroying the town so Lincoln could get blamed for the chaos. Feeling guilty for the damage, Lincoln asks the family to return home to Royal Woods. As the family leaves for home, Morag proceeds to make herself the new duchess of the town much to the displeasure of villagers. In retaliation, she hypnotizes Lela again to cause more destruction to the village.

Lucille tells the family of Morag's plan and what she's doing to the town. The Loud children head back to the town on a rowboat and team up to defeat Morag and un-hypnotize Lela. The sisters eventually get the scepter back and Lincoln, using his magic skills and with help from Lily, destroys the Dragon Stone, which breaks Lela out of her spell and in response, Morag is dropped on an island filled with noisy seals. The citizens of Loch Loud congratulate the family and ask Lincoln to resume his place as the duke of the kingdom, though Lincoln declines and instead offers the crown to Angus instead, feeling he deserves it more, a decision approved by the citizens and the other ghosts of the Loud ancestors. 

After helping repair the village, the Loud family says goodbye to Angus and the villagers and sets sail back home to Royal Woods. Bobby arrives to reunite with Lori only to find that she left. Clyde welcomes Lincoln back to Royal Woods with some duke-themed cream puffs.

During the credits, still images are shown that include but are not limited to the Duke's ghost riding Lela, Bobby reuniting with Lori, Leni contacting Scott online, Lincoln winning a 3rd place trophy at a magic show, Lela having laid three eggs, and Angus and the ghosts rescuing Morag who now works as the groundskeeper with Lela keeping her in line.

Cast

Production

Development
On March 28, 2017, Paramount Pictures' president Marc Evans announced a film based on the series originally set for a theatrical release on February 7, 2020. However, in January 2019, Paramount removed the film from their schedule. On February 5, 2019, it was announced that the film would instead be produced for release on Netflix.

Paramount president Marc Evans announced that, during Comic-Con, the studio will work closely with Viacom's TV brands, most notably Nickelodeon, which includes this movie. When the film was first announced at Comic-Con 2017, series creator Chris Savino stated that the film would be non-canon to the show. Dave Needham later contradicted Savino's claim stating that it is canon since Lily is still in her diaper appearance. In a later interview on the Nerds Social Club Podcast, Needham states that this film takes place during the summer somewhere between "Coupe Dreams" and "Schooled!"

Savino had no involvement on the film after being fired from the show due to sexual harassment allegations back in October 2017. In January 2021, it was announced that the film would be part of Netflix's 2021 film lineup. The film's cast and crew were revealed in April 2021, confirming the entire main cast will be reprising their roles from the show, including new members such as David Tennant, Billy Boyd, and Michelle Gomez.

Music
The film's soundtrack was released on the same day the film was released, August 20. The themes by Christopher Lennertz and the official music by Phillip White, it features many songs sung by Oh, Hush!, graywolfe, Distant Cousins and Tide Lines. The film's entire soundtrack is available on Spotify and from other popular MOD-providers.

Track listing:

Release
The Loud House Movie was originally scheduled for a theatrical release of February 7, 2020, however, in January 2019, Paramount Pictures removed it off their release calendar. On February 5, 2019, Viacom's CEO Bob Bakish announced that instead of the theatrical release by Paramount Pictures, the film would instead be released on the streaming service Netflix. This news was later confirmed by an official statement by Netflix announcing a "multi-year deal between Netflix and Nickelodeon" in November 2019. In April 2021, Netflix announced via teaser trailer that the movie would be released during the summer of 2021. In July 2021, Netflix announced via a trailer that the final release date for the film had been set for August 20, 2021.

Reception
The Loud House Movie was met with mixed to positive reviews from critics. Bob Hoose from Focus on the Family's pluggedin.com gave a positive review for the movie saying that "The Loud House Movie is a nicely balanced musical that somehow gives all of the kids—with their distinctive personalities and quirks—a moment to shine. All the while, it also delivers a rollicking, giggle-packed tale of castles, dragons and backstabbing caretakers". Common Sense Media's review published on The Washington Post noted that parents should "expect some name-calling like 'loser' and 'stinkin' Lincoln'," but noted that, "overall this is a funny, heartwarming story that the whole family can enjoy".

Accolades

Future

A live-action Christmas television film, titled A Loud House Christmas, was released to Nickelodeon and Paramount+ on November 26, 2021.

References

External links
 
 

2021 films
2021 animated films
2021 comedy films
2020s American animated films
2020s children's animated films
2020s children's comedy films
2020s adventure comedy films
2020s English-language films
American children's animated adventure films
American children's animated films
American adventure comedy films
American children's comedy films
American musical films
Animated films based on animated series
Animated films based on animated television series
English-language Netflix original films
Films about families
Films about vacationing
Films set in airports
Films set in Michigan
Films set in Scotland
Films set on airplanes
Films set on ships
The Loud House
Nickelodeon animated films
Nickelodeon original films
Submarine films